1,1,1,2-Tetrachloropropane is a compound of chlorine, hydrogen, and carbon. It has chemical formula CHCl. The structure has a propane skeleton, but four of the hydrogen atoms are replaced by chlorine atoms.

Preparation
1,1,1,2-Tetrachloropropane can be produced by addition of hydrogen chloride to 1,1,1-trichloropropene.
CCl3CH=CH2 + HCl → CCl3CHClCH3

References

Chloroalkanes